Shels may refer to:

*shels, rock band
Shelbourne F.C., Irish football team